Sreelekha Mitra is an Indian actress who is known for her work in Bengali cinema and television. Her first Acting stint was Balikar Prem, a Bengali TV seris by Dulal Lahiri. She then appeared in two odia films but those did not take off her career. After she bagged the role of Nabanita in Trishna (1996), a Bengali TV series directed by Anindya Sarkar, she went on to appear in a string of Bengali TV series and films.

Mitra starred in Basu Chatterjee's Hothat Brishti (1998) which became a major commercial success. She did not experience a significant elevation in her career as she did not reciprocated to Prosenjit Chatterjee's love for her.

Short films

Feature films

Hindi films

Bengali films

Odia films

Telefilms

TV series

Web series

Reality show

References

External links

Actress filmographies
Indian filmographies